Careless may refer to:

 Carelessness, a lack of awareness that can result in unintentional consequences

Music
 Careless (record label), a Philippine label
 Careless (album), by Stephen Bishop, 1976
 Careless, an album by Micky & the Motorcars, 2007
 Careless, an album by Richard Shindell, 2016
 "Careless" (song), by Paul Kelly and the Messengers, 1989
 "Careless", a song by Barenaked Ladies from Buck Naked, 1989
 "Careless", a song by Carly Pearce from Every Little Thing, 2017
 "Careless", a song by Cinerama from Torino, 2002
 "Careless", a song by Royal Blood from Royal Blood, 2014
 "Careless (Akasha's Lament)", a song by Jonathan Davis from Alone I Play, 2007

Other uses
 Careless (surname), including a list of people with the name
 Careless (film), a 1962 Italian film directed by Mauro Bolognini
 Careless, a 2007 film directed by Peter Spears
 Careless (novel), a 2006 novel by Deborah Robertson
 Tupolev Tu-154, NATO reporting name "Careless", a Soviet/Russian jet airliner

See also